Christian Alejandro González Peña (born 2 March 1977) is a Chilean former professional footballer who played as a forward for clubs in Chile and Asia.

Career
Born in Los Ángeles, Chile, González was a Chile youth international and played for Huachipato, Malleco Unido, Deportes Concepción and Everton in his homeland.

In 2003 he moved to Indonesia, where he had an extensive career playing for Semen Padang, PSMS Medan, Pelita Jaya, Persiku Kudus and Persisko Bangko. He also took part of club Sabor Latino in 2012, becoming the top goalscorer of the team. As a member of PSMS Medan, he won the 2005 Piala Emas Bang Yos (Gold Cup Bang Yos) alongside his compatriots Mario Quiñones, Luis Hicks and Alejandro Tobar. In Persiku Kudus, he coincided with his compatriot Octavio Pozo,

After a stint playing in Thailand, in 2016 he joined Assalam FC in the Liga Futebol Amadora Segunda Divisão thanks to Chilean coach Simón Elissetche, with whom he also returned to Indonesia by joining Aceh United in 2018.

Honours
PSMS Medan
  (Gold Cup Bang Yos):

References

External links
 

1977 births
Living people
People from Los Ángeles, Chile
Chilean footballers
Chilean expatriate footballers
Chile youth international footballers
C.D. Huachipato footballers
Malleco Unido footballers
Deportes Concepción (Chile) footballers
Everton de Viña del Mar footballers
Semen Padang F.C. players
PSMS Medan players
Pelita Jaya FC players
Persiku Kudus players
Aceh United F.C. players
Chilean Primera División players
Tercera División de Chile players
Primera B de Chile players
Indonesian Premier Division players
Liga 2 (Indonesia) players
Chilean expatriate sportspeople in Indonesia
Chilean expatriate sportspeople in Thailand
Chilean expatriate sportspeople in East Timor
Expatriate footballers in Indonesia
Expatriate footballers in Thailand
Expatriate footballers in East Timor
Association football forwards